This is a list of Wikipedia articles about brand-name companies (past and present) that have sold guitars, and the house brands occasionally used.

A 
 Airline
 Alembic
 Alvarez
 Ampeg
 Antoria
 Aria
 Ashton Music
 Avalon

B 
 Babicz
 Bailey, John
 B.C. Rich
 Behringer
 Blackbird
 Blade
 Bohemian
 Bond Electraglide
 Brawley
 Breedlove
 Burns

C 
 C.R. Alsip
 Campbell
 Caparison
 C.F. Martin
 Chapman
 Charvel
 Chesbro
 Cole Clark
 Collings
 Conde
 Cort

D 
 D'Alegria
 D'Angelico
 Daisy Rock Girl
 Danelectro
 Dean
 Diamond
 D'Aquisto, Jimmy
 Dobro
 Duesenberg

E 
 Eastwood
 Eccleshall
 El Degas
 Epiphone
 ESP
 Eko
 Electrical
 Ernie Ball

F 
 Fano
 Farida
 Fender
 Fernandes
 First Act
 Flaxwood
 Floyd Rose
 Fodera
 Framus
 Freshman
 Fret-King
 FujiGen
 Furch

G 
 G&L
 Gallotone
 Garrison
 Giannini
 Gibson
 Gilberto Grácio
 Gittler
 Godin
 Gordon-Smith
 Greco
 Greg Bennett
 Gretsch
 Guild
 Guyatone

H 
 Hagström
 Hallmark Guitars
 Hamer
 Harley Benton
 Harmony
 Heritage
 Höfner
 Hohner
 Hondo
 Hora
 Huss & Dalton Guitar Co.

I 
 Ibanez
 Italia

J 
 Jackson
 James Tyler
 Jay Turser
 Jeffrey Yong
 Jon Kammerer Guitars
 Joseph Lukes
 Jolana

K 
 Kahler
 Kadence
 Kalamazoo
 Kawai
 Kay
 Kiesel
 Klira
 Koll
 Kramer
 Kustom
 KxK Guitars

L 
 Lado
 Lâg
 Lakland
 Larrivée
 Levin
 Lichty
 Lindert
 Line 6
 Lipe
 Lotus
 Lowden
 Luna
 Lyle

M 
 Maestro
 Mann
 Maton
 Matsumoku
 Mayones
 Michael Kelly
 Micro-Frets
 Modulus
 Moniker
 Mosrite
 MotorAve
 Music Man

N 
 National

O 
 Oscar Schmidt
 Ovation

P 
 Parker
 Paulino Bernabe II
 Peavey
 Penco
 Petros
 PRS

R 
 RainSong
 Ramírez
 Recording King
 Reverend
 Rickenbacker
 Robin
 Ruokangas

S 
 Samick
 Sadowsky
 Santa Cruz
 Schecter
 Seagull
 Shergold
 Sigma
 Silvertone
 Smith
 Spector
 Squier 
 Stagg
 Steinberger
 Stella
 Suhr
 Suzuki
 Simon & Patrick

T 
 Tacoma
 Tagima
 Takamine
 Tanglewood
 Taylor
 Teisco
 Teton
 Tobias
 Tokai
 Tom Anderson
 Tonante
 Travis Bean
 Trembita
 TYM

U 
 Univox

V 
 Valco
 Valley Arts
 Vester
 Vigier
 Vintage
 VOX

W 
 Walden
 Warwick
 Washburn
 Westfield
 Westone
 William Laskin

Y 
 Yamaha
 Yairi

Z 
 Zemaitis
 Zon

References

 
Guitar